Wilhelm Gerhard Walpers (26 December 1816 in Mühlhausen – 18 June 1853 in Berlin) was a German botanist. This botanist is denoted by the author abbreviation Walp. when citing a botanical name.

He received his education at the Universities of Greifswald and Breslau, earning his habilitation in 1848 at Berlin. He died on 18 June 1853 from a self-inflicted gunshot wound.

The plant genus Walpersia (synonym Phyllota) is named after him.

Selected publications 
 Repertorium botanices systematicæ (six volumes, 1842–1847).

References

Botanists with author abbreviations
19th-century German botanists
1816 births
1853 deaths
People from Mühlhausen
University of Breslau alumni
University of Greifswald alumni
Members of the German Academy of Sciences Leopoldina
1850s suicides
Suicides by firearm in Germany